The Germany women's national under-17 football team represents Germany in international women's association football and is governed by the German Football Association (DFB). The national team was founded in 1992 as U-16 national team. Since the summer of 2001, the age limit is 17.

Fixtures and results

 Legend

2022

Current squad

Previous squads
 2008 FIFA U-17 Women's World Cup
 2010 FIFA U-17 Women's World Cup
 2012 FIFA U-17 Women's World Cup
 2014 FIFA U-17 Women's World Cup
 2016 FIFA U-17 Women's World Cup
 2018 FIFA U-17 Women's World Cup

Competitive record

FIFA U-17 Women's World Cup
The German team has participated in all tournaments. His best result was third place in 2008

UEFA Women's Under-17 Championship
The German team has participated in eleven of the twelve UEFA Women's Under-17 Championship winning 7 times and establishing a record for most european titles.

Nordic Cup
From 1988 to 1997 and 2008 to present (U16 national team); from 1998 to 2007 (U-17 national team)

(*) Note Norway 1989: Participated the selection of the Hessian Football Association

See also
 Germany women's national football team
 Germany women's national under-20 football team
 Germany women's national under-19 football team
 FIFA U-17 Women's World Cup
 UEFA Women's Under-17 Championship

References

External links
 Official website 

Women's national under-17 association football teams
Football
National team